Nelson Piquet Souto Maior (born 17 August 1952) is a Brazilian retired racing driver and businessman.

Piquet had a brief career in tennis before losing interest in the sport and subsequently took up karting and hid his identity to prevent his father discovering his hobby. He became the Brazilian national karting champion in 1971–72 and won the Formula Vee championship in 1976. With advice from Emerson Fittipaldi, Piquet went to Europe to further success by taking the record number of wins in Formula Three in 1978, beating Jackie Stewart's all-time record.

In the same year, he made his Formula One debut with the Ensign team and drove for McLaren and Brabham. In 1979, Piquet moved to the Brabham team and finished the runner-up in 1980 before winning the championship in 1981. Piquet in 1982 was hampered by severe engine unreliability, but he saw a resurgence for 1983 and his second world championship. For 1984–85, Piquet had once again lost chances to win the championship but managed to score three wins during that period. He moved to the Williams team in 1986 and was a title contender until the final round in Australia. Piquet took his third and final championship in 1987 during a heated battle with teammate Nigel Mansell which left the pair's relationship sour. Piquet subsequently moved to Lotus for 1988–89 where he experienced his third drop in form. He eventually went to the Benetton team for 1990–91 where he managed to win three races before retiring.

After retiring from Formula One, Piquet tried his hand at the Indianapolis 500 for two years. He also had a go at sports car racing at various points during and after his Formula One career. Piquet is currently retired and runs several businesses in Brazil. He also manages his sons Nelson Piquet Jr. and Pedro Piquet, who are also professional racing drivers.

Early life and career
Piquet was born 17 August 1952, in Rio de Janeiro, then the capital of Brazil, the son of Estácio Gonçalves Souto Maior (1913–1974), a Brazilian physician. His father moved his family to the new capital, Brasília, in 1960 and became Minister for Health in João Goulart's government (1961–64). Piquet had two brothers, Alexis, and Geraldo, and a sister Genusa. Piquet was the youngest of the children.

His father wanted Piquet to be a professional tennis player and was given a scholarship at a school in the United States, in Atlanta. Piquet started playing tennis at the age of 11. He won tournaments in Brazil and eventually took a trip to California to test his skill against tougher American players. During his time, he had learned to speak English and greatly matured. His short tennis career saw Piquet to be prized as a good player but not thought sufficiently exciting for the sport, which led him to devote his career to motor racing.

Piquet started kart racing at the age of 14, but because his father did not approve of his racing career, he used his mother's maiden name Piquet (of French origin and pronounced as "Pee-Ké") misspelt as Piket to hide his identity.

Piquet dropped out of a University two years into an engineering course in 1974. He was subsequently employed in a garage to finance his career, since he had no financial support from his family.

Upon returning to Brazil, Piquet and three friends brought a 20 hp cart and participated in Brazilian go-karting (1971 and 1972 national champion) and in the local Formula Super Vee 1976 championship, on the advice of Emerson Fittipaldi, the first Brazilian Formula One world champion who sold the chassis for the Brazilian Formula Vee champion car with his brother, he arrived in European motor sports hailed as a prodigy. In the 1978 British Formula 3 season he broke Jackie Stewart's record of the most wins in a season.

Formula One
Piquet made his Formula One debut for Ensign in Germany, starting 21st only to retire on lap 31 with a broken engine. After the race, Piquet drove a McLaren of BS Fabrications in the next three races, where he left good impressions. The deal was negotiated when BS Fabrications employees met Piquet when he was driving at Brands Hatch. His best finish was ninth in Italy.

Brabham (1978–85)
For the last race in 1978, Piquet moved to the Brabham team; he qualified in 14th and finished 11th. Piquet stayed with Brabham until 1985.

1979
In 1979, Piquet competed in his first full season in Formula One. He once again drove for the Brabham team, alongside double world champion, Niki Lauda. The season was difficult for the team, which was accustomed to success. Piquet retired from eleven of the fifteen races in the season. He started off his season being involved in a first-lap pile up and getting injured at the Argentine Grand Prix in Buenos Aires and crashing into Clay Regazzoni's Williams car at the Brazilian Grand Prix at Interlagos. The first points of his career came at the Dutch Grand Prix, where he finished fourth. He had a huge accident at the Italian Grand Prix; the rear section of his BT48 was completely ripped off at Monza's Curva Grande corner after another incident with Regazzoni; Piquet walked away uninjured. But even though the races saw him crash a few times, or retire with a semi-competitive car that had an unreliable engine, in qualifying Piquet performed well, qualifying in the top 5 several times – often out-qualifying Lauda. 2 weeks after the Italian round, Lauda abruptly quit driving before the start of the Canadian Grand Prix, leaving Piquet as the number one driver for Brabham, and leaving him and new recruit Ricardo Zunino to debut the new BT49, which had a Ford-Cosworth DFV engine; Brabham ditched the Alfa Romeo V12's in protest to Alfa Romeo entering as a full works team. In the final race, the United States Grand Prix at Watkins Glen, Piquet started from the front row and took the fastest lap in the race, clearly showing the new BT49's considerable potential.

1980

In 1980, Piquet finished a hard-fought 2nd in Argentina behind Alan Jones; the race was held in very hot conditions on a disintegrating track. There were doubts about the legality of the car as it was believed to be underweight. Jones went to see the car which gave the suspicion that ballast had been added to bring the car within the regulations to make it legal. 
Piquet took his first win at the United States Grand Prix West in Long Beach, California by over 50 seconds from Riccardo Patrese. 5 months later, Piquet scored back to back wins in the Netherlands and Italy. He finished second in the drivers' standings, 13 points behind title winner Alan Jones. In Canada, Piquet and Jones had contact off the start and Piquet's car was damaged and caused a major crash resulting in the race being red flagged. Jones, his Championship rival, continued in the race and joined the restart in the same car. Piquet switched to his qualifying car which had a special engine that was not set up to go the distance, so Piquet retired and Jones won the race and the World Championship from Piquet.

1981

The season began with the revocation of the South African Grand Prix's status as an FIA-sanctioned event due to the ongoing FISA–FOCA war. With the FISA teams boycotting the race, the FOCA teams staged a non-championship race there in South Africa held in wet conditions which was won by Carlos Reutemann with Piquet second. FISA and FOCA reached an agreement banning movable skirts and requiring a minimum ground clearance, excluding the tyres, of 6 cm.

After a third place in the United States Grand Prix West, Piquet qualified on pole position in his home race, the Brazilian Grand Prix in his birth city of Rio de Janeiro, but quickly faded from contention after starting the race on slick tyres on a soaking wet track. At the next race, the Argentine Grand Prix in Buenos Aires, Brabham got around the ground-clearance rule by devising a suspension system that kept the car at the required height during technical inspection but lowered it onto the ground at speed, allowing it to race once again as a wing car. The superiority of the car was such that Piquet easily swept to victory and even his less experienced Mexican teammate Héctor Rebaque, who could usually be found well down the order, managed to retain second place until he was forced to retire. At the San Marino Grand Prix, almost all the teams adopted the innovation brought to Argentina by Brabham. Piquet won the race despite being caught out by rain.

In the Belgian Grand Prix at Zolder, after an initial start which was aborted due to an accident involving Siegfried Stohr, his teammate Riccardo Patrese and mechanic Dave Luckett who inexplicably remained on the track at the start to restart Patrese's stalled car, Piquet went off again in the lead only to have Jones make contact on lap 10 forcing him to retire, with the race being won by Reutemann. After crashing in Monaco and Spain, Piquet was able to recover at the French Grand Prix at Dijon where he dominated until lap 58, when a sudden storm led to a red flag and the organizers decided to wait until the rain stopped to continue the race. At the restart 45 minutes later, Alain Prost appeared much more competitive after putting on slicks on a drying track mechanical work performed during the break and won his first Grand Prix with Piquet relegated to third place, behind Prost and McLaren's John Watson. In the next race, the British Grand Prix, Reutemann finished second to open up a seventeen-point lead in the standings while Piquet suffered tyre failure and crashed on the straight between Stowe and Club corners.

Piquet won the championship with a great comeback that began when he won the German Grand Prix at Hockenheim while Reutemann was enduring internal conflict with his teammate Alan Jones. After stringing together a series of decent results (even after losing 2nd in Italy due to engine failure on the last lap) whilst Reutemann only scored a few times, Piquet went into the last race of the season only a point behind Reutemann. At the Caesars Palace Grand Prix in Las Vegas, Piquet finished fifth to clinch the championship as Reutemann finished out of the points. Piquet was so dehydrated from the desert heat and exhausted from the anti-clockwise nature of the track that he vomited on himself during the race and had to be lifted out of his car when he returned to the pits.

1982
The following year, Piquet was fast but his car proved to be unreliable despite Brabham entering into an alliance with BMW to supply the team with turbocharged engines that although were powerful, were also very unreliable and were the main reason why the car retired from so many races. Aside from the first Grand Prix in South Africa Brabham started the season using the Ford-Cosworth engined BT49D. Piquet won the Brazilian Grand Prix in Rio de Janeiro; the extreme heat and immense adhesion of the cars meant that Piquet and other drivers suffered from exhaustion; Piquet fainted while collecting his trophy on the podium. Piquet was later disqualified for his car being underweight from a protest from Renault and Ferrari. Piquet did not drive the BMW-engined BT50 until Belgium, and the low point of the season was Detroit where he failed to qualify due to an engine failure in qualifying. The ruling of Piquet's disqualification led to a political attack on the lowering of the minimum weight against Ferrari and Renault who used turbo engines. Ferrari's changes to the rear wing at the United States Grand Prix West and the disqualification of Gilles Villeneuve after the race caused the FOCA teams to boycott the San Marino Grand Prix.

His only win was in the Canadian Grand Prix which was also BMW's first win in Formula One. In Germany, Piquet arrived to help Didier Pironi after he suffered a career-ending high-speed crash during practice. In the race, Piquet was leading until he collided with Eliseo Salazar whom he physically attacked at the side of the track on live television.

1983
Piquet won the opening race in Brazil in the arrow-shaped BT52 and followed this up with a retirement in the United States West Grand Prix. He scored a second place in France and took another second at Monaco also taking the fastest lap. He was 14 points behind Alain Prost with three races left in the season but took back-to-back victories at Monza and Brands Hatch to close to within two points. At the season-ending South African Grand Prix, Prost retired on lap 35 and Piquet cruised to a third-place finish, winning his second world title. It also was the first time a turbocharged car won the championship, and was BMW's first and only championship in Formula 1.

1984
With the new rule that limited the capacity of the tanks of the cars to 220 liters and forbade race refueling, Piquet started as the title favorite because it was thought that the 4-cylinder BMW would suffer less from the new fuel economy requirement than the 6-cylinder competition. The winter tests seemed to confirm the expectations, and in fact the car showed promise, but the expected results never materialised. The only good thing that came from the tests was the creation of special qualifying engines, which produced more than 900 hp and allowed Piquet to match what was then the record for pole positions in a year: nine, already held by Lauda and Ronnie Peterson.

The season was dominated by the McLaren team who were using TAG-Porsche engines. In Canada, the Brabham team introduced a curious additional radiator on the nose that was mounted on the car that improved reliability. Piquet won the race (after having retired from the previous 6 races, mostly through engine or turbo failure), but the additional radiator heated to the point that Piquet suffered burns on his right foot when pushing the accelerator pedal down; The heat had actually burnt a hole through his boots and he went to the podium barefoot after receiving first aid. He managed take a back-to-back win at Detroit after driving his backup car due to an accident that occurred at the start of the race.  These were his only two victories of the year. In Spielberg he could have won as the car of leading Niki Lauda suffered a loss of gears, but Piquet was unaware and did not attack. Piquet finished in 5th place in the championship.

1985

Prior to the  season, Piquet and Brabham conducted their winter testing at the Kyalami circuit in South Africa, along with the team's new tyre supplier Pirelli. It was through this testing that Pirelli came up with the tyre compounds they would use during the season. Unfortunately, unlike the hot conditions in South Africa, most of the European part of the season took place in unseasonably cold weather. This, and the Brabham BT54's weight distribution towards the back of the car saw the Pirelli tyres (especially the fronts) largely ineffective and left Piquet often fast, but ultimately uncompetitive.

It was Pirelli's first victory since returning to Formula One.

However, Piquet was becoming frustrated. He felt as if his loyalty to Brabham was being taken advantage of - his salary was lower than other drivers despite his success with the team - and he was not being informed of some team decisions. The switch to Pirelli tyres had been particularly upsetting: he felt it had been done purely for financial reasons and placed inordinate commitments on him for tyre testing. He was also concerned about financial security when he retired, citing the difficulties faced by Brazilian footballers Pelé and Garrincha after their professional careers ended. However, he was well integrated with the team and enjoyed close relationships with Gordon Murray and his mechanics, making him reluctant to leave.

He had been in contact with McLaren, but was discouraged by the PR duties that came with it: "(Ron Dennis) mentioned so many days a year working for Marlboro... I lost interest. I won't waste my life talking to people who don't understand racing." Williams offered him a contract worth three times his Brabham contract, and with the turbocharged Honda engine quickly becoming one of the best on the grid, it was an offer too good to refuse. After some thought, he reluctantly left Brabham after seven seasons and two world championships.

Williams (1986–87)

1986
It was reported that Honda were paying the bulk of his US$3.3 million contract. When Piquet had signed for Williams at 1985 Austrian Grand Prix, Piquet did not regard Mansell as a serious threat, as the Briton had not won a race yet in his fifth year in Formula One (and would win his first race a month later). Piquet had underestimated Mansell, and the Englishman came out of 1985 on a confidence high after winning 2 of the last 3 races in 1985. Both were regarded as high-strung characters with delicate temperaments, and two top drivers in the same team was a recipe for fireworks – and sure enough Mansell and Piquet went head to head for the title. Piquet had wanted to play the role as the number one driver. According to Piquet, the verbal agreement with Frank Williams on this point was clear, and Williams's comment that in signing Piquet he had "signed the best driver in the world" seemed to back that up. However, shortly before the beginning of the season, Frank Williams suffered a serious car accident that kept him away from the team for a long time and caused a permanent physical disability. The team was then led by technical director Patrick Head, who was also Mansell's race engineer.

Though the two drove what were clearly the best cars on the grid, their rivalry caused each to deprive the other of points, allowing Alain Prost to win one of the closest and most fiercely disputed championships ever in Formula One. The season began well with Piquet dominating the Brazilian Grand Prix and at the next the race, the San Marino Grand Prix, Piquet finished second behind Prost. During the season, fellow Brazilian and former dual-World Champion Emerson Fittipaldi estimated that Piquet could not commit more driving errors early in the season when he was judged as the best driver in the field.

Piquet (and reportedly Honda) left Adelaide following the Australian Grand Prix, fuming that Williams had not honoured their contract and had allowed Mansell to win races instead of ordering him to let the Brazilian by. Had Mansell let Piquet pass to take some extra wins, Piquet could have easily won the championship, instead of the two of them being beaten by Prost in what was an inferior car (though Prost did manage 11 podium finishes, including 4 wins). In this season Piquet won more races (a total of four) than he would in any of his championship-winning campaigns.

1987
He was also a very good testing and development driver, and was able to develop the Williams car further to make it even more competitive. At times during the season, the rift between himself and Mansell was evident, as Mansell was showing superior speed in qualifying and races. Piquet had also admitted to "not ever being quite right" after his qualifying crash for Round 2 at Imola. He was ordered by FISA's medical chief, Prof. Sid Watkins, not to race due to the concussion he suffered when his Williams hit the wall at high speed at the Tamburello curve. He was offered by RAI to join Mario Poltronieri and Clay Regazzoni to comment on the race. Piquet, who had maintained friendly relations within the commentary box, sent Ezio Zermiani. Piquet accepted improvising as a commentator, but beyond the short journalistic experience, Piquet complained at year-end about the fact that the incident had left strong psychological effects in its aftermath which had caused insomnia.

It became obvious that the continued development of the FW11 meant that it was clearly the best car that year, and the 1987 championship was going to be disputed between Piquet and Mansell. Despite winning fewer races than Mansell in 1987, Piquet emerged as world champion. From Detroit to Portugal, he never finished off the podium, racking up points in what he called his "percentage driving policy" in his successful bid to win his 3rd championship. Piquet announced during practice for the 1987 Hungarian Grand Prix that he had signed with Lotus as the undisputed number 1 driver, a position he claimed was promised at Williams from 1986, but was never honored following Frank Williams' car crash. It was also believed this was a big factor in Honda dropping Williams and moving to McLaren for 1988, despite another year left in the contract. The Japanese company, who paid most of Piquet's salary, considered him to be the number 1 and were privately fuming that Williams management did not rein in Mansell and allow Piquet an easier time.

Lotus (1988–89)

1988
Nelson, who had 20 wins and 3 World Championships following the 1987 season, began to lose his reputation when he had no wins in 1988, losing his number one status to fellow Brazilian Senna, who won 8 races and the championship for McLaren (Prost won 7 races, while Piquet could only manage three 3rd-place finishes for the season).

In early 1988 he resorted to using the media to attack his rivals and gained a reputation as an outspoken "loose cannon," such as attacking Mansell and his wife, calling Mansell "an uneducated blockhead" (and insulting his wife's looks), and calling fellow Senna "the São Paulo taxi driver" and stating that he "doesn't like women." Piquet retracted his comments when both threatened legal action. He also earned the ire of the Tifosi at the San Marino Grand Prix when he said in an interview with Playboy that Scuderia Ferrari might do better as a team if the boss (Enzo Ferrari) was a younger man instead of the 90-year-old one who rarely attended races due to his age and failing health. Piquet claims he was badly misquoted in the interview, which also had him questioning Alain Prost's standing as the best driver in the world. On the official FIA video review of the 1988 season, Piquet left no doubts that the article got it wrong in his comments about Ferrari (saying that at 90, Enzo Ferrari had to be a strong man to run a Formula One team), and that he considered Prost to be the world's best driver.

Before the start of the 1988 season, the Rio de Janeiro circuit was renamed in Piquet's honor.

1989
Piquet had a disappointing 1989 season, driving a Judd V8-powered Lotus which had 125 less hp than the Honda V10s used by McLaren. He did, however, have an excellent (considering the Lotus car’s limitations) 4th place in the British Grand Prix at Silverstone where he overtook theoretically faster cars and was running third until Nannini overtook him in the last few laps. He (and teammate Satoru Nakajima) once again had no wins and they both even failed to qualify for the 1989 Belgian Grand Prix, Piquet's first non-qualification since the 1982 Detroit Grand Prix. On what was his last attempt to qualify at Spa, Piquet lost his chance when he was slowed by rookie Frenchman Olivier Grouillard, who had gained a reputation throughout the season as a blocker.

Benetton (1990–91)

1990

The late season announcement by Lotus meant that there were almost no seats left with one of the top teams (McLaren, Ferrari and Williams), leaving Piquet with the unenviable possibility of not having a drive for 1990. However, the Benetton team had a seat become available when they decided not to retain fill-in driver Emanuele Pirro. After two lacklustre seasons at Lotus, Piquet was forced to sign an incentive based payment-by-results deal with Benetton, who had acquired the services of John Barnard for their 1990 car, the B190 and had exclusive use of the factory Ford-Cosworth HB4 V8 engine.

Despite a handful of lacklustre performances and sometimes being outperformed by fast Italian teammate Alessandro Nannini who was forced into retirement before the Spanish Grand Prix (after his right forearm had to be surgically re-attached following a helicopter crash) Piquet scored two wins in the last two races of the season. The first in Japan was somewhat inherited after Senna had taken out Prost's Ferrari at the first turn, and both Gerhard Berger (McLaren) and Mansell (Ferrari) retired. It was his first win since the 1987 Italian Grand Prix. The second was just two weeks later at the last race of the season in Australia when after a great drive, Piquet survived a spirited, but fair, challenge from the V12 Ferrari of Mansell to win what was the 500th World Championship Formula One Grand Prix. His 18 points from the last two races saw him move from 7th in the standings (26 points) to finishing 3rd in the championship with 43. Piquet and Gerhard Berger both scored 43 points (Piquet had scored 44 but was forced to drop 1 point under the "Best 11" rule of the time), but Piquet's two wins, where Berger won none, saw him finish third.

1991
This was followed by the final win of his F1 career at Montreal in  – again at the expense of longtime rival Mansell, whose Williams-Renault stalled past the old pits on the last lap while leading. In late 1991, Piquet's teammate Roberto Moreno was replaced by Michael Schumacher, who remained for the rest of the season. He had talked to the Ligier and Ferrari teams about securing a drive, but Piquet then announced his retirement from Formula One in January 1992 to concentrate on his business activities.

Other racing ventures

Indianapolis 500
Piquet attempted to race in the Indy car series and was hired by Team Menard to drive in the 1992 Indianapolis 500. He had taken to the track well, and appeared comfortable driving at high speeds despite never before racing on an oval. During practice, Piquet's car ran over a metallic piece of debris and drove through turn 3 at full speed. When driving through turn 4, Piquet abruptly took his foot off the pedal to enter the pit lane, which resulted in the car spinning and hitting the wall. Piquet suffered serious foot and ankle injuries and was forced to sit out the race. He returned after rehabilitation in 1993 and managed to qualify. He started in 13th position, but finished in 32nd, dropping out with engine problems after only 38 laps.

Sports cars

Alongside Formula One, Piquet took part in the 1000km Nürburgring in 1980 and 1981 driving a BMW M1. He won the 1981 race alongside the German Hans-Joachim Stuck. However, the race had to be stopped roughly two hours in because of the fatal crash of Herbert Müller after 17 laps of the 14-mile (23 km) course.

In 1996, Piquet competed in the Le Mans 24 Hours driving a McLaren F1 GTR alongside Johnny Cecotto and Danny Sullivan, finishing eighth overall.  In the following year, Piquet took part alongside JJ Lehto and Steve Soper, but the car was retired due to an accident that occurred while Lehto was driving. That same year, in December, he won the Mil Milhas Brasileiras driving the McLaren F1 GTR with Johnny Cecotto and Steve Soper.

On 20 January 2006, Nelson Piquet won the 50th edition of the Mil Milhas Brasileiras (Brazilian 1,000 miles) at the Interlagos circuit. He drove an Aston Martin DBR9 alongside his son, Nelsinho, and drivers Christophe Bouchut and Hélio Castroneves. At the end of the race, an exhausted Piquet was quoted saying to a friend he would "never sit in a cockpit again."

Driver management
Since 2000, he has supported the career of his son, Nelson Piquet Jr., who drove in the F1-feeder category GP2 for 2 seasons, achieving a best championship result of second with four race wins, and was a test driver for Renault F1 in 2007.

During the Crashgate scandal, Piquet pledged to use his wealth to find out why his son had been ordered by the Renault team to crash deliberately during the 2008 Singapore Grand Prix. He and his son were eventually paid a six-figure sum for costs and libel damages.

Helmet

Piquet's helmet is white and red with a thick line resembling the seam on a tennis ball (possibly due to his father wanting him to be a tennis player), and teardrop shapes filling in the round areas on the sides and top. The seam and teardrops were usually red or orange with black trim, but some parts were yellow during his Lotus years due to the Camel sponsorship, and reverted to a deep red when he left Lotus for Benetton. His sons Nelson Jr. and Pedro followed his helmet design.

Business ventures
Upon leaving motor sport, he founded Autotrac in 1994, a company that provides mobile data messaging and tracking of customers' trucks by satellite (GPS tracking). This business concluded quite successfully as the pioneer because the freight transportation of Brazil depended on trucks.

Piquet founded a racing team, Piquet Sports, in 2000. The purpose was to help the participation of Nelson Piquet Jr. in Formula Three Sudamericana. It was founded eight months before Nelson Junior turned 16.

Piquet runs some other businesses, based in Brasília.

Personal life
Known as a practical joker, Piquet lived a stereotypically playboy racing driver lifestyle, earning and losing and earning again a series of small fortunes in his business dealings. He remains a competitive driver in sports car racing, albeit more for fun than with serious intent. Never a fan of street circuits (save for Adelaide in Australia), he was critical of the Monaco Grand Prix by famously stating Monaco was like "riding a bicycle around your living room," but that "a win there was worth two anywhere else."

Piquet's first marriage lasted one year, during which a son was born in 1977. His second produced three children, including Nelson Angelo Piquet and Kelly Piquet. He also has another son from a previous relationship. He has two children with his current wife, including Pedro Estacio Piquet.

On 31 July 2007, Piquet, after repeated speeding and parking offenses, was stripped of his civilian driving licence and ordered by the Brazilian courts to attend a week of lessons in order to "learn good and safe driving conduct", and to then pass an exam. His wife Viviane received the same sentence. "I think we have to pay for our mistakes," Piquet told Brazilian media. "It's not just a speeding problem, I got tickets for all kinds of reasons, like parking where I shouldn't."

He was inducted into the International Motorsports Hall of Fame in 2000 and two racing circuits in Rio de Janeiro (formerly the Jacarepaguá Circuit) and in Brasília have been named "Autódromo Internacional Nelson Piquet", though the Rio circuit has since been demolished to make way for venues to be used in the 2016 Summer Olympics, with Rio de Janeiro the host city. Since his retirement, Piquet has been ranked among the greatest Formula One drivers. He was ranked 13th by Autosport in 2009, and 16th by BBC Sport in 2012.

In a 2012 interview on Brazilian TV with himself and former Williams teammate Nigel Mansell, Piquet revealed that he had never been right after his accident at Imola in 1987. The crash caused him to lose some 80% of his depth perception and saw him secretly visit a hospital in Milan every two weeks through the season fearing that if he told his team they would not let him drive. He went on to say that he should have won the championship in 1986 and Mansell should have won in 1987, and that after 1987 he drove for the money as due to his condition he was no longer able to lead races from the front (each of his six wins following his Imola accident were inherited from others dropping out late).

On 11 November 2013, Piquet underwent heart surgery from which he made a complete recovery.

Insulting language
In 1988, Piquet made comments in a magazine about his rival Nigel Mansell, calling him an "uneducated blockhead" and calling his wife "ugly". He also called Ayrton Senna "gay" and Enzo Ferrari "senile", saying that if Enzo Ferrari was 30 years younger, Ferrari would be a better team than it was. Mansell was in particular incensed about the personal attacks on his family which he believed were "out of order". Piquet continued to publicly refer to Senna as gay as late as 2020.

In 2021, during an interview on a Brazilian podcast, Piquet used the racially pejorative Portuguese term "neguinho" when discussing an incident between Lewis Hamilton and Max Verstappen at the 2021 British Grand Prix. After the comments resurfaced on social media in 2022, his use of the racial slur received condemnation from F1 and the community. Piquet later apologised for his remarks, explaining that they were not intended to be racist. 

Following this apology, new footage revealed Piquet also used homophobic language against Hamilton in a 2016 interview. When asked of his opinion about Keke Rosberg, the 1982 Formula One World Champion, Piquet described him as "a turd that has no value". He insinuated the reason Lewis Hamilton lost the 2016 Formula One World Championship to Rosberg's son, Nico Rosberg, was because Hamilton "must have been giving lot of ass at the time, he was that bad". 

As of July 2022, Piquet has been banned from the F1 paddock. Craig Slater of Sky Sports F1 reported that despite his apology, Piquet, "for the foreseeable future at least, will not be welcome in the Formula 1 paddock". The British Racing Drivers' Club also suspended Piquet’s membership "with immediate affect ”, and are expected to terminate his status as an honorary member, following a 7 day notice period.

Racing record

Career summary

Complete European Formula 3 results
(key) (Races in bold indicate pole position) (Races in italics indicate fastest lap)

Complete Vandervell British F3 Championship results
(key) (Races in bold indicate pole position) (Races in italics indicate fastest lap)

Complete Super Visco British F3 Championship results
(key) (Races in bold indicate pole position) (Races in italics indicate fastest lap)

Complete Formula One World Championship results
(key) (Races in bold indicate pole position; races in italics indicate fastest lap)

† Did not finish, but was classified as he had completed more than 90% of the race distance.

Formula One non-championship results 
(key) (Races in bold indicate pole position)
(Races in italics indicate fastest lap)

Complete BMW M1 Procar Championship results
(key) (Races in bold indicate pole position; races in italics indicate fastest lap)

Complete PPG IndyCar World Series results 
(key) (Races in bold indicate pole position)

Indianapolis 500

24 Hours of Le Mans results

References

External links

 Entry on Nelson Piquet from grandprix.com
 Nelson Piquet Statistics
Nelson Piquet from Revs Digital Library

1952 births
Living people
Brazilian people of French descent
Brazilian racing drivers
Brazilian Formula One drivers
Formula One World Drivers' Champions
Formula One race winners
Benetton Formula One drivers
BS Fabrications Formula One drivers
Brabham Formula One drivers
Ensign Formula One drivers
Team Lotus Formula One drivers
Williams Formula One drivers
Brazilian IndyCar Series drivers
Indianapolis 500 drivers
International Motorsports Hall of Fame inductees
British Formula Three Championship drivers
FIA European Formula 3 Championship drivers
Businesspeople from Rio de Janeiro (city)
Sportspeople from Rio de Janeiro (city)
24 Hours of Le Mans drivers
World Sportscar Championship drivers
Nelson Piquet
BMW M drivers
Schnitzer Motorsport drivers